Anatoly Vasilyevich Akentyev (born 23 December 1939) is a retired Russian cross-country skier who won the 15 km race at the 1967 Holmenkollen Ski Festival. He competed at the 1968 Winter Olympics in the 15, 30, 50 and 4 × 10 km events and finished 10th–20th individually and fourth in the relay.

After retiring from competitions Akentyev became a prominent skiing administrator. He was vice president of the International Ski Federation (FIS) since 1979 and its honorary vice president since 2006. Nationally he headed the Soviet and Russian cross-country skiing teams for 15 years and served as president of the Russian Ski Union from 1996 to 2004.

References

1939 births
Living people
Cross-country skiers at the 1968 Winter Olympics
Olympic cross-country skiers of the Soviet Union
Soviet male cross-country skiers
Russian male cross-country skiers
Honoured Masters of Sport of the USSR
Members of the Congress of People's Deputies of the Soviet Union